Movement for Justice and Development may refer to:

Movement for Justice and Development (Slovenia)
Movement for Justice and Development in Syria
Algerian Movement for Justice and Development